Ophicardelus is a genus of small, air-breathing land snails or salt marsh snails, terrestrial pulmonate gastropod molluscs in the family Ellobiidae.

Species

Species within the genus Ophicardelus include:
 Ophicardelus costellaris H. Adams & A. Adams, 1854 - New Zealand, Australia, synonym: Ophicardelus australis H. H. Beck, 1838
 Ophicardelus ornatus (Férussac, 1821) - synonym: Ophicardelus ornata A. de Férussac, 1821 - Australia, (drawing)
 Ophicardelus quoyi H. Adams & A. Adams, 1855 - synonyms: Ophicardelus irregularis Mousson, 1869; Ophicardelus minor Mousson, 1869 - Australia
 Ophicardelus sulcatus H. Adams & A. Adams, 1855 - Australia

Synonyms:
 Ophicardelus layardi H. Adams & A. Adams, 1855 is a synonym of Allochroa layardi (H. Adams & A. Adams, 1855)

References

Further reading 
 Powell A. W. B., New Zealand Mollusca, William Collins Publishers Ltd, Auckland, New Zealand 1979

External links 

Ellobiidae